Giovanni Francesco Zacharias Franken (born 14 November 1977) is a retired footballer who played as a midfielder and head coach of the under-21 team of ADO Den Haag.

Born in the Netherlands, Franken represented the Netherlands Antilles at international level. He was also head coach of the Aruba national football team between October 2013 and August 2015.

Career

Club career
Born in Rotterdam, Franken played club football for Feyenoord, DOTO, Dordrecht, VVM, RKC Waalwijk, BVV Barendrecht and RVVH. He moved from DOTO, where he was captain, to BVV Barendrecht in May 2006. He signed for RVVH in February 2007.

International career
He represented Netherlands Antilles at international level, earning 8 caps between 2004 and 2008, which included 7 games in FIFA World Cup qualifying matches.

Coaching career
In the 2010–11 season, Franken was in charge of RVVH's women's team, while still playing for the club's first team. After one season, he gained promotion to the best women league in the Netherlands. At the end of the 2010-11 season, he also retired as an active player. Ahead of the 2011–12 season, he took charge of RVVH's reserve team 

From 2013 to 2018, Franken was in charge of RVVH's first team. In October 2013 he was also appointed manager of the Aruba national football team, combining it with his coaching position at RVVH. He left this position in August 2015.

On 4 January 2018, it was announced that Franken would take charge of Achilles Veen from the 2018–19 season. After seven months, Franken left the club by mutual agreement on 25 January 2019. 

On 20 February, Franken was appointed interim manager of FC IJsselmonde for the rest of the season. In June 2015, Franken joined ADO Den Haag as manager for the U15 squad. In the 2020-21 season, he took charge of the U18 squad. In June 2021 it was confirmed, that Franken had been promoted to the first team staff as assistant coach to ADO manager Ruud Brood. In March 2022, he took over as caretaker manager after Brood had been dismissed, almost leading the club to promotion in the play-offs. From the 2022–23 season, Franken was put in charge of ADO's under-21 team.

References

1977 births
Living people
Footballers from Rotterdam
Dutch footballers
Dutch Antillean footballers
Netherlands Antilles international footballers
Feyenoord players
FC Dordrecht players
RKC Waalwijk players
Eerste Divisie players
Eredivisie players
Association football midfielders
Dutch football managers
Aruba national football team managers
BVV Barendrecht players
RVVH managers
ADO Den Haag non-playing staff
ADO Den Haag managers